Clepsydra Geyser is a geyser in the Lower Geyser Basin of Yellowstone National Park in the United States.

It was named by T. B. Comstock during the 1878 Captain Jones expedition, with its nomenclature derived from the Greek word for water clock. Prior to the 1959 Hebgen Lake earthquake, it erupted regularly every three minutes.

References 

Geysers of Wyoming
Geothermal features of Teton County, Wyoming
Geothermal features of Yellowstone National Park
Geysers of Teton County, Wyoming